Noble Edward Irwin (September 29, 1869 – August 10, 1937) was a United States Navy Rear Admiral and Navy Cross recipient.

Biography
He was born at Greenfield, Ohio on September 29, 1869. Irwin was also mentioned in the Executive Officer's official report for "intelligent personal work" on vessel repairs after the battle.

Noble Irwin commanded  in 1914 during the Fourth Battle of Topolobampo, a naval battle between Mexican forces during the Mexican Revolution.

Captain Irwin was awarded the Navy Cross for meritorious service as Director of Naval Aviation during World War I. Thereafter he was in command of battleship , and Destroyer Squadrons of the Scouting Fleet, and was Chief of the Naval Mission to Brazil (1927–1931).

Rear Admiral Irwin became Commandant of the 15th Naval District in March 1931 and was transferred to the Retired List 1 October 1933. He died at Warner Springs, California on August 10, 1937.

Legacy
Rear Admiral Irwin was the father-in-law of Admiral Charles A. Lockwood.  The US destroyer  was named in his honor.

References

1869 births
1937 deaths
People from Greenfield, Ohio
United States Navy admirals
Recipients of the Navy Cross (United States)
United States Naval Academy alumni